Jim Stevenson (1935 – 2 March 2009) was a Scottish footballer who played for Dundee, Dunfermline Athletic and Cheltenham Town.

He started his playing career as a wing half, featuring briefly for Dumbarton then played for junior side Camelon Juniors before being signed by Dundee, making 10 appearances in 1955–56 before he was required to undertake two years of national service in the Royal Air Force where he played for RAF Kirkham.

Eventually released by Dundee, he joined Dunfermline Athletic in October 1959, becoming the club's first choice centre half. 3 December 1960 saw Stevenson break his leg, an injury which caused him to miss Dunfermline winning the Scottish Cup.

His return to the team came almost a year after the injury on 2 September 1961 in a reserve game against Motherwell and he was eventually recalled to the first team in a 9–0 cup win over Wigtown & Bladnoch on 27 January 1962. However, manager Jock Stein brought in Jim McLean who successfully filled the defensive role along with George Miller, and Stevenson was eventually released at the end of 1962–63.

After leaving Dunfermline Athletic he and his wife Joyce moved to England, settling in Cheltenham; he played for non-league Cheltenham Town and started working as an Electronics Engineer with Smith Industries Aviation. After retiring from football he refused to go into coaching and eventually retired from his job at Smith's.

Stevenson had for a number of years suffered from Alzheimer's Disease and had spent the last three years of his life in a Gloucestershire nursing home. He died on 2 March 2009 at the nursing home in Mitcheldean.

References

1935 births
2009 deaths
Footballers from Falkirk
Scottish footballers
Dundee F.C. players
Dumbarton F.C. players
Dunfermline Athletic F.C. players
Cheltenham Town F.C. players
Camelon Juniors F.C. players
Scottish Football League players
Scottish Junior Football Association players
sportspeople from Cheltenham
Association football central defenders
Association football wing halves